The Inter American University of Puerto Rico, Metropolitan Campus is located in Cupey, San Juan, Puerto Rico. It was built in San Juan due to the large success of the Polytechnic Institute of Puerto Rico. It started its first semester in 1982. It is part of the Inter American University of Puerto Rico System.

Notable alumni
 Daniel George (Orlando, FL) - C.E.O of Limitless Home Health Care

External links

 IAU-Metro Website

Educational institutions established in 1982
Interamerican University of Puerto Rico
1982 in Puerto Rico
1982 establishments in Puerto Rico